Playtime is a 1967 film by Jacques Tati.

Playtime or Play Time may also refer to:

Music

Albums
 Playtime (album), by Buddy Rich, 1961
 Playtime, by Akido, 2004
 Playtime, by Barbara Higbie and Teresa Trull, 1998
 Playtime, by David Hillyard and the Rocksteady 7, 1999
 Playtime, by DJ Neekola, co-produced by Rex Riot, 2010
 Playtime, by Eevee, 2012
 Playtime, by Kent Marcum, 2005
 Playtime, by Michael Zentner, featuring Jon Catler, 1995
 PlayTime, by Nicole Theriault, 2001

Songs
 "Playtime", by Cindytalk from In This World, 1988
 "Playtime", by the Deviants from The Deviants 3, 1969
 "Playtime", by Heavenly from Carpe Diem, 2009
 "Playtime", by Khalil, 2014
 "Playtime", by Lukas Graham from Lukas Graham, 2015
 "Playtime", by Nightmares on Wax from A Word of Science: The First and Final Chapter, 1991
 "Playtime", by Yanni from Ethnicity, 2003

Television
 Playtime (TV series), a German program
 Playtime, a segment of the Philippine program Art Jam

Episodes
 "Playtime" (Bookmice)
 "Playtime" (Pretty Little Liars), 2017
 "Playtime" (seaQuest DSV), 1994
 "Play Time" (Thomas & Friends), 2010
 "Playtime" (Zoboomafoo), 1999

Other uses
 Recess (break), or playtime, an activity period for schoolchildren
 Playtime, a 1998 art exhibition by Mall Nukke
 Playtime, a character from Baldi's Basics

See also
 Playtime Is Over (disambiguation)
 Workers' Playtime (disambiguation)
 PROJECT: PLAYTIME — is a free-to-play multiplayer horror game